Diarmaid Ó Seachnasaigh, Irish knight and Chief of the Name, died before 1567.

Ó Seachnasaigh was a descendant of Seachnasach mac Donnchadh, himself a descendant of the kings of Uí Fiachrach Aidhne. Successive Ó Seachnasaigh's have ruled the district of Cenél Áeda na hEchtge since at least the 13th century. The clan had been vassals of either the Ó Briain of Thomond or the Burke of Clanricarde, supremacy depending.

For over two hundred years Ireland west of the River Shannon had been beyond the pale of the Anglo-Irish administration based in Dublin. From 1533, Henry VIII began integrating them into his realm, knighting Diarmaid Ó Seachnasaigh and representatives of other clans. Henry later evolved this into the policy of Surrender and regrant. Ó Seachnasaigh's submission of 9 June 1543 stated that:

All the manors, lordshipps, towns and town-lands of Gortynchegory, Dromneyll, Dellyncallan, Ballyhide, Monynean, Ardgossan, Ballyegyn, Kapparell, Clonehaghe, Tollenagan, Lycknegarishe, Crege, Karrynges, Tirrelagh, Rathvilledowne, Ardmylowan, one-third part of Droneskenan and Rath; the moiety of Flyngeston, Ardvillegoghe, Dromleballehue, Cowle, and Beke

were now to be held by him and his male heirs to the crown.

Sir Diarmaid Ó Seachnasaigh married Mór Pheachach Ní Briain. The Annals of the Four Masters record her death sub anno 1569:

More Phecagh, daughter of Brian, the son of Teige, son of Turlough, son of Brian Catha-an-aenaigh O'Brien, and wife of O'Shaughnessy, i.e. Dermot, the son of William, son of John Boy, a woman distinguished for her beauty and munificence, died.

Their children were Sir Ruaidhrí Gilla Dubh Ó Seachnasaigh and Diarmaid Riabach Ó Seachnasaigh.

References

 D'Alton, John, Illustrations, Historical and Genealogical, of King James's Irish Army List (1689). Dublin: 1st edition (single volume), 1855. pp. 328–32.
 History of Galway, James Hardiman, 1820
 Tabular pedigrees of O'Shaughnessy of Gort (1543–1783), Martin J. Blake, Journal of the Galway Archaeological and Historical Society, vi (1909–10), p. 64; vii (1911–12), p. 53.
 John O'Donovan. The Genealogies, Tribes, and Customs of Hy-Fiachrach. Dublin: Irish Archaeological Society. 1844. Pedigree of O'Shaughnessy: pp. 372–91.
 Old Galway, Professor Mary Donovan O'Sullivan, 1942
 Galway: Town and Gown, edited Moran et al., 1984
 Galway: History and Society, 1996

People from County Galway
Diarmaid
16th-century Irish people